The Light Between Us is the third studio album by the English band Scouting for Girls. It was released in the United Kingdom on 31 August 2012. The album includes the singles "Love How It Hurts" and "Summertime In the City".

Singles
 "Love How It Hurts" was released as the lead single from the album on 8 July 2011. The song peaked to number 17 on the UK Singles Chart. The song was originally intended to be released off the re-release of their second album, Everybody Wants to Be on TV.
 "Summertime In the City" was released as the second single from the album on 26 August 2012. The song peaked to number 73 on the UK Singles Chart.
 "Without You" was released as the third single from the album on 15 October 2012.

Track listing

Chart performance

Release history

References

2012 albums
Scouting for Girls albums